Weiert Martin Velle (18 May 1925 – 29 April 2007) was a Norwegian veterinarian.

He was born in Lista. He took the dr.med.vet. degree in 1959, and also the dr.philos. in 1999. He was a professor of physiology at the Norwegian School of Veterinary Science from 1965 to 1993, and served as rector there from 1975 to 1982. He co-edited the journal Acta Veterinaria Scandinavica from 1973 to 1987. He resided at Blommenholm and died in April 2007 in Bærum.

References

1925 births
2007 deaths
People from Farsund
Norwegian veterinarians
Academic staff of the Norwegian School of Veterinary Science
Rectors of the Norwegian School of Veterinary Science